Hoti is a village in the municipality of Plav, Montenegro.

History
'Hoti i Vendit' or 'Hoti i Kujit' is a settlement of the Hoti tribe.

Demographics
According to the 2011 census, its population was 205.

References

Populated places in Plav Municipality
Albanian communities in Montenegro